
Lac du Mont d'Orge (or Lac de Montorge) is a small lake above Sion, Valais, Switzerland.

External links
Montorge 
1930, la glace empilée 

Mont d'Orge